Wbeymar Angulo Mosquera (born 6 March 1992), commonly known as Wbeymar, is a professional footballer who currently plays as a midfielder for Alashkert, on loan from Ararat-Armenia. Born in Colombia, he represents the Armenia national team.

Club career
Wbeymar began his career in Colombia Patriotas, Bogotá, Atlético Huila and Alianza Petrolera. In January 2014, Wbeymar signed with Murciélagos in the Liga Premier de Ascenso. On 31 July 2015, Wbeymar was presented as a new signing for Gandzasar Kapan in the Armenian Premier League.

On 7 December 2020, Ararat-Armenia announced the signing of Wbeymar on a free transfer from Gandzasar Kapan after they withdrew from the Armenian Premier League.

On 16 January 2023, Wbeymar joined Alashkert on loan for the remainder of the season alongside teammate Agdon.

International career
On 27 August 2020, Wbeymar was called up to the Armenia national football team for his debut time, for their games against North Macedonia and Estonia on 5 and 8 September 2020 in the 2020–21 UEFA Nations League.

Career statistics

Club

International

Scores and results list Armenia's goal tally first, score column indicates score after each Armenia goal.

References

1992 births
Living people
People from Quibdó
Armenian footballers
Armenia international footballers
Colombian footballers
Colombian emigrants to Armenia
Expatriate footballers in Mexico
Expatriate footballers in Armenia
Patriotas Boyacá footballers
Bogotá FC footballers
Atlético Huila footballers
Alianza Petrolera players
Categoría Primera A players
Murciélagos FC footballers
Categoría Primera B players
FC Gandzasar Kapan players
Armenian Premier League players
Association football midfielders
Naturalized citizens of Armenia
Armenian people of Colombian descent
Sportspeople from Chocó Department